To Heaven from Hell is an EP by British heavy metal band Diamond Head. Although all the songs on the EP were initially released on 1982's Borrowed Time, it is a collection of Diamond Head's early demos from before their debut album Lightning to the Nations was released. The album gives an insight to how the band initially wished their songs to sound before MCA tried to commercialize Diamond Head.

Many of the songs have a much more raw feel about to them compared with their initial appearance on Borrowed Time.

Track listing
All songs by Harris, Kimberly, Scott, Tatler.

"Dead Reckoning"
"Heat of the Night"
"Borrowed Time"
"Don't You Ever Leave Me"
"To Heaven from Hell"

Credits 
Brian Tatler – guitar, vocals
Sean Harris – vocals
Duncan Scott – drums
Colin Kimberly – bass

References

Diamond Head (band) albums
1997 albums